No Questions Asked is a  1951 American crime film noir directed by Harold F. Kress and starring Barry Sullivan, Arlene Dahl, George Murphy and Jean Hagen.

Sidney Sheldon, the screenwriter, would go on to become one of the top-10 best selling fiction writers of all time.

Plot
Ellen (Sayburn) Jessman returns from a skiing vacation and Steve Keiver is at the airport to pick her up in his pal Harry's taxi. Keiver wants to marry Ellen, but as an insurance company's investigator, he doesn't make much money and knows that concerns her.

Keiver's boss, Manston, can't give him a raise, but mentions in passing how the recovery of some stolen furs would be worth $10,000, the company being off the hook for the insurance. Keiver bravely but recklessly approaches known mobsters, explaining the proposal. After being roughed up, he eventually cuts a deal and gets a $2,500 bonus from his boss. But when he brings Ellen a diamond ring, he learns she's left town, having married a wealthy man while on vacation.

A bitter Keiver decides to keep making deals with criminals for returned stolen merchandise, no questions asked. He makes a lot of money and begins dating colleague Joan Brenson, who has always been attracted to him. But he carries a torch for Ellen, and when she's back in town, Keiver tries to win her back, now that he's rich.

The police resent Keiver's activities. What he is doing is legal, but barely. Inspector Duggan puts his man O'Bannion on the case. Ellen and Joan end up together in a large women's lounge at intermission of a Broadway show. Two women rob all the ladies there of their jewelry and flee. Outside the theater, they remove their wigs and reveal themselves to be men.

Joan, broken-hearted that Keiver has gone back to Ellen, brings him a message from Harry where he can retrieve the stolen gems. Franko, a mobster who swims in a pool for exercise, has them, but Keiver is double-crossed. Knocked out, the jewels taken from him, Keiver suspects either Joan or Harry of betraying him, but it turns out it was Ellen. She's got the jewels and is after the money herself, along with husband Gordon, but is shocked when Franko decides to torture her to find out where they are hidden.

Franko then murders both Ellen and Gordon and ends up underwater with Keiver in a fight to the death. A stronger swimmer, Franko wins, but when he surfaces, Duggan and other armed cops are waiting for him. Keiver is pulled from the pool and survives. Joan is still in love with him.

Cast

 Barry Sullivan as Steve Keiver
 Arlene Dahl as Ellen Sayburn Jessman
 George Murphy as Police Insp. Matt Duggan
 Jean Hagen as Joan Brenson
 Richard Anderson as Detective Walter O'Bannion
 Moroni Olsen as Henry Manston
 Danny Dayton as Harry Dycker (as Dan Dayton)
 Dick Simmons as Gordon N. Jessman
 Howard Petrie as Franko
 William Phipps as Roger
 William Reynolds as Floyd (as William Regnolds)
 Mauritz Hugo as Marty Callbert
 Mari Blanchard as Natalie
 Robert Sheppard as Detective Eddie
 Michael Dugan as Detective Howard
 Howland Chamberlain as Beebe (as Howland Chamberlin)
 Richard Bartlett as Betz
 Robert Osterloh as Owney

Reception
According to MGM records the film earned $483,000 in the U.S. and Canada and $173,000 elsewhere, resulting in a loss of $377,000.

Critical response
The film staff at The New York Times gave the film a tepid review: "Barry Sullivan gives the role of the money-hungry lawyer a solid but uninspired reading. Jean Hagen is quite attractive and credible as the girl he finally comes to love, while Arlene Dahl is merely attractive as the double-crossing charmer he yearns for before he sees the light. Standard, come to think of it, is as nice a word as any for No Questions Asked."

Critic Craig Butler liked the film and wrote "A tasty little 'B' level noir thriller, No Questions Asked is the kind of neat little film that, despite its flaws, exerts a hold on the viewer. Sidney Sheldon's screenplay starts out with a slam-bang opening, leading into a flashback that captivates for a good while before losing its way a bit in the middle and then getting back on track in time for a good, solid climax."

Dennis Schwartz called the film "An efficiently done film noir about an insurance fraud resulting in a double-cross..." And added, "It was strictly a B movie with an ordinary and predictable story, and with below average acting. If you ask no questions about it, it is mildly enjoyable. Otherwise the film never quite faces up to the moral implications of Sullivan and his cabbie friend, as they do business with criminals while thinking they are not doing anything wrong. When Sullivan gets his comeuppance, it's done in a breezy style that is not all that convincing. The screenwriter was Sidney Sheldon, who by the 1970s was to go on to bigger and better things in the mystery genre."

References

External links
 
 
 
 

1952 films
1952 crime films
American crime films
American black-and-white films
Cross-dressing in American films
Film noir
Films scored by Leith Stevens
Metro-Goldwyn-Mayer films
Films directed by Harold F. Kress
1950s English-language films
1950s American films